Peter Jeffrey Revson (February 27, 1939 – March 22, 1974) was an American race car driver and heir to the Revlon cosmetics fortune.  He was a two-time Formula One race winner and had success at the Indianapolis 500.

Background
Peter Revson was born in New York City, the son of Martin Revson (1910–2016) and Julie (née Phelps) Hall (1914–2000).  Martin had been a founding partner (along with his brother Charles Revson) of Revlon cosmetics, but had parted ways in 1958 and become chairman of Del Laboratories in 1963. His mother had been a nightclub singer at the time Martin met her.

A young, handsome bachelor described as a "free spirit", Peter passed up an easy life for one of competition and danger. Off the track, he lived at the same accelerated pace, Revson piloting a  ChrisCraft and courting some of the most beautiful women in the world.  At the time of his death, he was engaged to the 1973 Miss World, Marjorie Wallace.

Early life and racing career

Peter Revson spent his childhood in White Plains, New York, in Westchester County, attended prep schools, and lived off the fruits of his father’s million-dollar empire. He had two sisters, Jennifer and Julie Ann, as well as a younger brother Doug, who was killed in a race in Denmark in 1967. Though considered well educated, Peter never finished his college education after attending Columbia University, Cornell University, and the University of Hawaii. In 1960, while attending the University of Hawaii, Revson bought a Morgan and entered into sports car racing. In his first race, Revson placed second, but he placed first in his next race. To the dismay of his family, Revson began to turn his attention to competitive racing full time. Teaming with Cornell classmate Timmy Mayer and friend Bill Smith, and managed by Teddy Mayer under the Rev-Em Racing banner, Revson competed in formula junior in 1962, losing the financial aid of the Revson family as a consequence. Without support from his family, Revson embraced his independence and generated funds through his savings and education funds.

In 1963, after limited successes and with Formula 1 aspirations, Revson took the remaining money he had, around $12,000, and moved to the UK. There he was able to buy a Formula Junior Cooper and a Ford Thames van named Gilbert. He then began barnstorming around mainland Europe competing and winning against the likes of future formula stars Denny Hulme and Jochen Rindt. Sleeping in his van and earning a living from prize money he earned from races, Revson soon caught the attention of Reg Parnell, from whom Revson rented workshop space, and was offered a spot on Parnell’s planned F1 team for the 1964 season. Revson made his initial Formula 1 debut late in the 1963 season in an exhibition race at the Gold Cup in Oulton Park, England, finishing ninth. Revson teamed with fellow drivers Chris Amon and Mike Hailwood, referred to as the Ditton Road Flyers, and received more attention due to their antics and wild parties than their performances on the track. Due to a number of factors, including the sudden death of Reg Parnell, financial troubles, and an uncompetitive car in the Lotus 24, Reg Parnell/Revson Racing was doomed before it even began. After racing in four Grands Prix and five non-championship races that season, Revson's best results came at Monza, finishing 13th, as well as a fourth place finish at Solitude during a non-championship race.

Barely noticed on the European circuits due to his limited Formula 1 success, Revson accepted an offer to race back in the United States in 1965. Focusing mainly on sports car racing, including the Can-Am and Trans-Am series, Revson was able to rebound from his Formula 1 woes and quickly rebuild his reputation as a capable driver. In 1969, Revson competed in his first Indy 500, finishing an impressive 5th place after starting last. To make the feat even more impressive, Revson was racing in an underpowered Brabham BT25. At the Indy 500 the following year, Revson gained major exposure and entrance to a top team when McLaren’s Indy car team asked him to drive the race following the release of Chris Amon. That same year, while teamed with famed movie star Steve McQueen, the duo finished second in the 12 hours of Sebring behind a Ferrari driven by Mario Andretti. Though McQueen received most of the credit for driving with a broken foot, it was Revson who drove the bulk of the race in the Porsche 908/2. Revson also the finished the 1970 Can-Am season runner-up while driving a Lola T220 for the Haas team.

1971 proved to be the proverbial breakout season for Revson. During the Indy 500 that year, driving a McLaren M16, Revson qualified on pole position averaging 178.696 mph. He went on to finish second in the race behind Al Unser Sr. However, the real success came during the Can-Am series that year. Now driving for the McLaren team in the M8F, Revson rolled past the competition to a championship. In 10 races, Revson won five including at his home track at Watkins Glen and placed on the podium in all but two of the races. His successes caught the attention of the Formula One teams. He was even offered a one-race drive that year with the Tyrrell team as a third driver at Watkins Glen. In 1972 Revson was offered a full-time seat racing for the McLaren Formula One team, headed by Revson's old friend and boss Teddy Mayer. Revson was now a driver in McLaren’s Indy Car, Can-Am, and Formula One teams.

Formula One career
During Revson's first year with McLaren during the 1972 season at the age of 33, Revson was able to finish 5th in the championship standing. Running 9 out of the 12 races, Revson finished on the podium four times with three third place finishes and a second place finish. Greater success was soon to follow for Revson. The following season Revson secured his only two wins during his short Formula One career. Driving a McLaren M23, Revson first tasted victory during the British Grand Prix at Silverstone and later the Canadian Grand Prix at Mosport Park. Despite his growing successes as a driver, Teddy Mayer was not satisfied and they opted for the 1972 Formula One champion and Marlboro-sponsored Emerson Fittipaldi. Revson soon signed with the rather new Shadow formula 1 team for the 1974 season. In addition, Revson became engaged to 1973 Miss World Marjorie Wallace after meeting her at the Indy 500 that year. Driving a Shadow DN3, Revson retired from the first two races of the season. Despite this Revson liked the car and had high hopes about the season.

Death
Revson was killed during a test session on 22 March 1974, before the 1974 South African Grand Prix in Kyalami. While driving the Shadow DN3, he suffered a front suspension failure and crashed heavily into the Armco barrier on the outside of "Barbecue Bend". The car stood on its nose, wrapped itself around the barrier and caught fire, and although safety workers and other drivers managed to pull Revson from the wreckage, he was already dead.

Tony Southgate, designer of the DN3, (Motorsport Magazine June 2012, Pg 84.) –

He was the second Revson to lose his life racing; his brother Douglas was killed in a crash in Denmark in 1967. Peter and Douglas Revson are interred together in a crypt in the community mausoleum at Ferncliff Cemetery in Hartsdale, New York. Revson's autobiography, Speed with Style, co-written with Leon Mandel, was published posthumously by Doubleday & Company in 1974.

Revson was replaced by Tom Pryce, who died three years later at the same Grand Prix.

Awards
Revson was inducted into the Motorsports Hall of Fame of America in 1996 in the sports car category.

Racing record

Complete Formula One World Championship results
(key) (Races in bold indicate pole position)

Non-Championship Formula One results
(key) (Races in bold indicate pole position)
(Races in italics indicate fastest lap)

Complete USAC Championship Car results

Indianapolis 500 results

Complete Canadian-American Challenge Cup results
(key) (Races in bold indicate pole position) (Races in italics indicate fastest lap)

See also
List of select Jewish racing drivers

References

All work no playboy | Motor Sport Magazine Archive. (2014, November 27). Retrieved from All work no playboy

Chang, R. S. (2008, May 29). McQueen's Porsche, but Memories of Another Driver. Retrieved from

(n.d.). Retrieved from 

There but for fortune | Motor Sport Magazine Archive. (2014, December 23). Retrieved from There but for fortune

External links
Bruce McLaren Trust website with articles featuring Revson

1939 births
1974 deaths
American Formula One drivers
Hotchkiss School alumni
Cornell University alumni
Reg Parnell Racing Formula One drivers
Tyrrell Formula One drivers
McLaren Formula One drivers
Shadow Formula One drivers
Formula One race winners
Indianapolis 500 drivers
Indianapolis 500 polesitters
Trans-Am Series drivers
Burials at Ferncliff Cemetery
Racing drivers who died while racing
International Race of Champions drivers
Sport deaths in South Africa
24 Hours of Le Mans drivers
Racing drivers from New York City
World Sportscar Championship drivers
24 Hours of Daytona drivers
Jewish American sportspeople
20th-century American Jews